"Bedingungslos" is a song by German recording artist Sarah Connor. It was written and produced by Connor along with Peter Plate, Ulf Leo Sommer, and Daniel Faust for her ninth studio album Muttersprache (2015). An orchestra-driven pop ballad, the song was released as the album's second single on 4 November in German-speaking Europe, where it reached the top forty on both the German and Swiss Singles Chart.

Formats and track listings

Charts

Weekly charts

References

External links
  
 

2015 singles
2015 songs
German-language songs
Polydor Records singles
Sarah Connor (singer) songs
Songs written by Peter Plate
Songs written by Sarah Connor (singer)
Songs written by Ulf Leo Sommer